Ludwig August Ritter von Frankl-Hochwart (3 February 1810 in Chrast, Bohemia – 12 March 1894 in Vienna) was a Jewish Bohemian-Austrian writer and poet. He was a friend of Nikolaus Lenau. Also, he corresponded with Petar II Petrovic Njegos of Montenegro  before he died in 1851. Frankl's Gusle, Serbische Nationallieder was dedicated to Vuk Karadžić's daughter in 1852. His object was to present some of the songs in Vuk which had not yet been translated, and he took the greatest pains to reproduce in German the metrical effect of the Serbian original.

References

List of manuscripts At the Wiener Stadtbibliothek
List of Works from Deutsche Dichterhandschriften des Poetischen Realismus at Brigham Young University

External links

 Frankl-Hochwart, Ludwig August Ritter von at the aeiou Encyclopedia
 Digitized works by Ludwig August von Frankl at the Leo Baeck Institute, New York

1810 births
1894 deaths
People from Chrast
People from the Kingdom of Bohemia
19th-century Austrian male writers
Austro-Hungarian writers
Austrian medical writers
Austrian knights
19th-century Austrian poets
Austrian male poets
Holy Land travellers